Events from the year 1536 in India.

Events
 The tomb of Jamal Kamali completed 
 Bahadur Shah of Gujarat second reign as sultan of Gujarat Sultanate begins (ends 1537)

Births
 Joao De Bustamante, pioneer of the art of printing in India, specifically in Goa is born (dies 1588).

Deaths
 Jamali Kamboh, poet and Sufi of the Suhrawardiyya sect.
 Guru Jambheshwar, founder of the Bishnoi dies (born 1451)

See also

 Timeline of Indian history

References

 
India